Novogireyevo may refer to:
Novogireyevo District, a district in Eastern Administrative Okrug of the federal city of Moscow, Russia
Novogireyevo (Moscow Metro), a line of the Moscow Metro, Moscow, Russia
FC Novogiryevo Moscow, an defunct association football club in Russia for which Sergey Bukhteyev played in 1910–1914